The Lions (known as the Sigma Lions for sponsorship reasons) is a South African professional rugby union team based in Johannesburg in the Gauteng province. They competed in the Super Rugby competition until 2020, and have competed in the United Rugby Championship since 2021. They are the successor of the teams known as Transvaal (1996), Gauteng Lions (1997) and the Cats (1998–2006).

They had varied results in Super Rugby, finishing at the bottom of the table six times (in 1998, 2003, 2004, 2008, 2010 and 2012), but reaching the semifinal stage five times (in 2000, 2001, 2016, 2017 and 2018). The team reached their 3rd consecutive final in 2018 when they lost against the  38–17 in Christchurch. The team plays its home matches at Ellis Park Stadium.

The team faced relegation from the Super 14 after the Southern Spears won a court ruling that they should be included in the competition in place of the lowest ranked South African team in the 2006 competition.  However, the Spears and the country's national federation, the South African Rugby Union, reached a settlement of their legal case. By the terms of the settlement, announced on 16 November 2006, the financially troubled Spears abandoned their case.

As part of a second attempt to introduce Super Rugby into the Eastern Cape, the South African Rugby Union mandated that the Lions, who finished bottom of the 2012 Super Rugby table, would be replaced in the 2013 competition by the Southern Kings from Port Elizabeth. The Lions' exclusion lasted just one season as they regained their place in Super Rugby for the 2014 season by beating the Southern Kings in a two leg playoff after the Kings finished bottom of the 2013 South African conference.

History

Transvaal (1993–1995)
The Super 10 was a rugby union tournament featuring ten teams from Australia, New Zealand, South Africa, Tonga, and Western Samoa. The competition ran for three years from 1993 to 1995 and was the predecessor of the Super 12 and Super 14, now known as Super Rugby.
Transvaal won the competition in 1993 beating Auckland 20–17 at Ellis Park in the final after winning all four their pool games and were finalists again in 1995, losing to Queensland.

Transvaal/Gauteng Lions (1996–1997)
When the Super 12 was launched in 1996, both Australia and New Zealand created franchise-based models for their teams in the new tournament. South Africa used the previous seasons Currie Cup to determine what provinces would play in the new international tournament. Transvaal played in the first ever season, winning three of their 11 fixtures, finishing in 10th position on the end of season ladder, above the Canterbury Crusaders and the Western Province.

Transvaal were again promoted to the Super 12 for the 1997 season, and played under the title of the Gauteng Lions. The Lions' season was a lot more successful than their results in the inaugural season. The Lions won and lost five matches, and drawing one, to finish in fifth place overall on the end of season table, two points behind the fourth-placed Natal Sharks, narrowly missing out on a place in the finals.

Cats (1998–2005)

For the 1998 season SA Rugby changed the Currie Cup qualification process for the Super 12, following Australia and New Zealand by forming provincial franchises. The Cats, or Golden Cats were established as one of the four new franchises, and were centered around the Golden Lions, as well as the Leopards and Pumas, as well as drawing from the Free State, Griffons and Griquas. The Cats home ground was to be shared between Ellis Park and the Free State Stadium.

The Cats did not make the finals in their first two seasons, but the appointment of former New Zealand coach Laurie Mains for the 2000 season signalled a change in fortunes. After defeating the Bulls in Pretoria in the opening round, they also defeated the Stormers at home in round two. However, the Cats' good fortunes soon went sour as they fell to four straight losses, even going down 64–0 to the Brumbies. The losing streak was snapped when the Cats pulled off a one-point victory over the Sharks in Durban. Following a bye, the Cats stormed through the remainder of the season undefeated to finish in fourth position, their best finish yet, as well as qualifying for a semi-final.

The semi-final was played at the Brumbies' home ground in Canberra, with the homeside winning 28–3 to knock the Cats out of the finals. The 2001 Super 12 season started off in a positive style for the Cats; defeating the Stormers 29–24, and then crushing the Highlanders 56–21, as well as narrowly losing a reply of last season's semi-final against the Brumbies 19–17. The Cats qualified for the finals again, finishing in third place bettering last season's fourth. However, they were again knocked out in the semi-finals, losing 30–12, this time to the Sharks. The Cats did not qualify for the finals the next few seasons. Then the Super 12 was expanded into the Super 14 for the 2006 season, with the addition of two new teams; the Cheetahs and the Western Force. The Cats finished in 13th place overall.

Lions (2006–present)
On 8 September 2006, the Golden Lions Rugby Union, the union that at the time operated both the Golden Lions and the Cats, announced that the team would be known in the future as the Lions, and unveiled a new logo.

During the 2010 Super 14 season, the Lions lost all 13 games of the season, setting a new record. The previous record was held by the Bulls, with 0 wins from the 11-game season in 2002. On 20 January 2011, the club announced a 3-year sponsorship deal with telecoms company MTN. From 2011 to 2012 they were known as the MTN Lions for sponsorship reasons. Ivor Ichikowitz and Robert Gumede pledged to purchase a 49.9% stake in the club through their investment company GumaTac in October 2010. The deal fell apart in 2011 due to differences with GLRU executives. In February 2011, the club signed Springbok fly-half Butch James among other high-profile signings Lionel Mapoe, Pat Cilliers and Rory Kockott.

Relegation and Lions Challenge Series, 2012–
After finishing on the bottom of the Super Rugby table for the third time in five seasons, South African Rugby Union (SARU) officials voted in August 2012 to relegate the Lions from the competition and promote the Eastern Cape-based Southern Kings. On 10 January 2013, the GLRU launched a schedule of 16 matches called the 2013 Lions Challenge Series. This series would begin on 19 January against Russia, and conclude on 20 July against Top 14 team Grenoble, to be followed by the Super Rugby promotion/relegation play-off.
At the launch of the series, President Kevin de Klerk said:
We took major umbrage to the decision made in Cape Town last year to relegate us, and the easy route would have been to play the blame game and look for scapegoats... But we have decided to get on with the rugby and ensure we continue to serve our stakeholders."
Several of the scheduled Lions Challenge games, including a proposed tour to the United States, never took place. Thus the idea of a Challenge Series was perceived to have failed. But despite not having the best lead up to the important Super Rugby promotion match-up with the Southern Kings later that year, the Lions ended up winning the two legged series. Thus they were promoted back into Super Rugby for 2014.

Resurgence: 2014–present
Determined to establish themselves as a top team in Super Rugby, the Lions made wholesale changes to the team, including hiring Johan Ackermann and Swys de Bruin as main coaches, overhauling much of the playing squad, and adopting a much more open and fluid playing style. The Lions returned to Super Rugby by defeating the Cheetahs in their first match back in the competition. They ended up winning 7 out of 16 matches and ended 12th, above the Reds, Cheetahs and Rebels.
The 2015 season brought even more success to the union as they won 9 out of 16 matches, including 3 out of 4 matches on tour to Australasia. The Lions lost out to a spot in the play-offs when they drew to the Stormers in their final group stage match.
The 2016 season was expanded to 18 teams with the Jaguares (Argentina), Sunwolves (Japan) and Southern Kings (South Africa) joining the competition. The Lions would start the season on tour beating the Sunwolves and Chiefs but losing to the Highlanders in the final game. The Lions would go on to win 11 out of 15 matches in the group stages to top the Africa 2 conference and top the Africa group and were awarded with their first conference trophy. They ended 2nd on the overall log and qualified for their first knockout match since being re-branded as the Lions. In the quarter-final they beat the Crusaders and the Highlanders in the semi-final to qualify for their first final since the current Super Rugby competition began in 1996. On 6 August they played in the final against The Hurricanes away from home with cold, wet and windy conditions that would favor the home team, as they lost 20–3.
In the 2017 season the Lions would get an easier draw, which meant they only had to face Australian teams and no New Zealand teams. With this advantage they would win 14 out of 15 matches, only losing one game away from home to the Jaguares due to sending another weaker team to Argentina. The Lions would not regret the decision as they would top the overall log to gain home advantage throughout the playoffs. The Lions would go on to beat the Sharks in the quarter final and were tasked to face their first New Zealand opposition in the semi final, the Hurricanes, whom they would defeat. The Lions became only the second South African franchise since the Bulls (2009, 2010) to qualify for back-to-back finals. They hosted the final at Emirates Airline Park against the Crusaders (setting the record for attendance at a Super Rugby final in the process), but lost 25-17 as they were forced to play much of the match short-handed after second-rower Kwagga Smith was sent off for a late tackle in the air. This was Ackermann's final game as head coach, having previously accepted a move to Aviva Premiership side Gloucester Rugby for 2017-18: de Bruin was promoted as his replacement for 2018.

Season summaries
The following table summarises the Lions' results in their Super Rugby seasons:

Location
They are based in Johannesburg, and have always been centred around the Lions union (Johannesburg), drawing players from that union since the inception of the competition as Super 12 in 1996.

Through 2005, the Cats also drew players from the two unions based in Free State —the Free State Cheetahs (Bloemfontein) and Griffons (Welkom)— and the Griquas (Northern Cape). That arrangement ended when the Cheetahs were admitted to the competition.

Starting in 2006, they drew players from the Leopards (North West) and Pumas (Mpumalanga) unions, which previously were in the franchise areas of the Bulls.

From the start of 2017, they could only draw players from the Griquas (Northern Cape).

Stadium
The Lions' home ground is Ellis Park Stadium (known for sponsorship reasons as the Emirates Airline Park), named after an employee from the Johannesburg City Council, Mr JD Ellis, with whom the rugby union negotiated to acquire the land on which the stadium is built. The stadium is in Johannesburg. Ellis Park hosted a number of matches at the 1995 Rugby World Cup, including the final, which was played out between the All Blacks and South Africa, which saw South Africa win the William Webb Ellis Cup in an emotional final.

Current squad

The Lions squad for the 2022–23 United Rugby Championship is.

Captains

Coaches
The current head coach of the Lions super rugby team is Ivan van Rooyen, who has taken over from Swys de Bruin.

Honours

 Super Rugby Runners-up
2016, 2017, 2018
 Super Rugby Group Winners
2016, 2017
 Super Rugby Conference Champions
2016, 2017, 2018

Minor Honours
 Gauteng Rugby Cup Runners-up
2013

Team Statistics & Records

 Most tries in a season 92 -2017 (SA record)
 Most tries in a match  14 -2017 (Superugby record)
 Highest Score in match 94 -2017 (SA record)
 Most Points in a season 674 - 2017 (Superugby record)
 Highest winning margin 87 -2017 (2nd most)
 Most wins in a season 16 -2017 (SA Record)
 Most home wins in a season 9 -2017 (SA Record)
 Most Consecutive wins 12
 Most Consecutive home wins 13
 Most Consecutive away wins 6          
 Most Consecutive wins versus South-African teams 19
 Most Consecutive Conference Titles 3 (SA Record; tied with Stormers)
 Most Consecutive Finals Appearances 3 (SA Record)

Individual Statistics & Records

 Most tries in a season: 12 — Malcolm Marx
 Most tries in a match: 4 — Courtnall Skosan and Madosh Tambwe
 Most points in a season: 190 — Elton Jantjies
 Most points in a match: 29 — Marnitz Boshoff
 Most drop goals in a match: 3 — Marnitz Boshoff
 Most drop goals in a season: 8 — Marnitz Boshoff

Notes

References

External links 

 

 
Super Rugby teams
South African rugby union teams
Sport in Johannesburg
Sport in North West (South African province)
Sport in Mpumalanga